Lucius Durham Battle (June 1, 1918 – May 13, 2008) was a career Foreign Service officer who served with distinction in Washington, Europe and Southwest Asia.

Early life
Battle was born on June 1, 1918 in Dawson, Georgia and his family later moved to Bradenton, Florida. He received his undergraduate (1939) and law (1946) degrees from the University of Florida, and spent World War II in the Navy serving in the Pacific theatre.

His wife, Betty Davis Battle (1924–2004), was a Stanford-educated political scientist, attorney, and arts foundation official at the Woodward Foundation, which placed works by American artists in embassies around the world.

State Department career
After the war, Battle moved to Washington with the goal of joining the foreign service. He had no prior connections and no Ivy league credentials, but with persistence he was finally hired to the Canada desk of the United States Department of State in 1946, during the administration of President Harry S. Truman. A chance encounter with Dean Acheson led to his being elevated to the position of Special Assistant to the Secretary of State. He traveled with Acheson, served as his right-hand man, attended meetings, and saw every piece of paper that entered or left the Secretary's office. Acheson grew quite fond of his "indispensable aide," once noting with a nod toward Battle, that a successful diplomat needs "an assistant with nerves of steel, a sense of purpose, and a Southern accent." The two men would remain close friends for the rest of Acheson's life.

As Acheson's tenure was coming to a close, Battle moved overseas to serve as First Secretary in the American Embassy, Copenhagen from 1953 to 1955. Then he moved to Paris for one year at North Atlantic Treaty Organization headquarters in Paris, under Lord Ismay before returning to the States in 1956 to work with the Rockefeller Family as Vice President of Colonial Williamsburg.

After the election of President John F. Kennedy in 1960, Battle returned to Washington to rejoin the State Department as its first Executive Secretary (until May 1962). He next served as Assistant Secretary of State for Education and Culture (June 5, 1962 to August 20, 1964), helping to coordinate cultural events in Washington and working with Senator J. William Fulbright on the Fulbright Scholars program.

In September 1964, President Lyndon B. Johnson appointed him as U.S. Ambassador to the United Arab Republic (Egypt). In Cairo, he faced a number of challenges, including the Thanksgiving Day attack on the U.S. Embassy Library, which was burned to the ground by a group of African students protesting U.S. policies. Battle was effective and well regarded by his Egyptian counterparts, despite increasing tensions between Gamal Abdel Nasser and U.S. officials.

On March 5, 1967, Battle left Egypt to return to Washington to take up the position of Assistant Secretary of State for the Near East and North Africa. (He has the rare distinction among Foreign Service officers of having held the position of Assistant Secretary twice.) Within weeks, Israel attacked Egypt and the Six-Day War began.

Later career
In 1968, Battle resigned from the Foreign Service to work as Vice President of Communications Satellite Corporation (COMSAT).

Battle turned down two Ambassadorial posts: to Vietnam in the Johnson administration and to Iran in 1977, thereby avoiding captivity during the Iran hostage crisis.

He became president of the Middle East Institute, from 1973 to 1975 before returning to Comsat until 1980. Next he started the Foreign Policy Institute at the Johns Hopkins School of Advanced International Studies in 1980, and finished his career as president of the Middle East Institute from 1986 until his retirement in 1990.

In 1984, Ambassador Battle was awarded the Foreign Service Cup, an award given annually to a retired Foreign Service officer by Diplomatic and Consular Officers, Retired.

Affiliations
Battle served on the board of directors of a number of institutions, including:
 Trustee of the John F. Kennedy Center for the Performing Arts
 Trustee, Washington Gallery of Modern Art
 President of the American Foreign Service Association
 Vice Chairman of Meridian House International
 Chairman of Governing Board at St. Albans School
 Member of the Chapter of the Washington National Cathedral
 President of Bacon House Foundation
 Trustee of the George C. Marshall Foundation
 Director of the Foreign Policy Association and the World Affairs Council
 National Board of the Smithsonian Associates
 Board of Governors of the Metropolitan Club
 American Academy of Diplomacy
 First chairman of the Johns Hopkins Foreign Policy Institute
 Trustee of the American University in Cairo
 Chairman of the Visiting Committee for the Center for Middle Eastern Studies of Harvard College
 Member of the Advisory Board of the Center for Contemporary Arab Studies of Georgetown University
 Advisory Committee, American Near East Refugee Aid

Writings
 Communications and the Economy: Communications and Peace, by Lucius D. Battle, 1975
 "Peace: Inshallah", article in Foreign Policy, No. 14, Spring 1974.
 Reminiscences of Lucius D. Battle, Oral History. 51 pp., 1974

External links
 Harry S. Truman Presidential Library and Museum: Lucius D. Battle papers and oral history
 John F. Kennedy Presidential Library: oral history
 Lyndon B. Johnson Presidential Library: oral history
 The Library of Congress: Two interviews in the Foreign Affairs Oral History Collection of the Association for Diplomatic Studies and Training: July 10, 1991 and November 14, 1968
 U.S. Department of State: Lucius D. Battle official biography
 CNN Cold War series
 Columbia University International Negotiations Project: oral history about Cyprus crisis 1968
 National Council on US Arab Relations
 The First Resort of Kings: American Cultural Diplomacy in the Twentieth Century by Richard T. Arndt, Chapter on Battle's tenure in cultural affairs in '61 and his work to bolster the Peace Corps: 
 University of Virginia archives: transcript of interview with Paige Mulholland about the Johnson administration
 Cairo Ambassador's Residence photo, website showing the home of the American chiefs of mission to Egypt
 Lucius D. Battle scholarship at the Johns Hopkins School of Advanced International Studies

Obituary at The New York Times

Assistant Secretaries of State for the Near East and North Africa
Ambassadors of the United States to Egypt
Assistant Secretaries of State for Education and Culture
University of Florida alumni
Harvard University people
United States Department of State officials
1918 births
2008 deaths
People from Dawson, Georgia
United States Foreign Service personnel
Fredric G. Levin College of Law alumni
United States Navy personnel of World War II
American expatriates in Denmark
American expatriates in France